Dr. Bezbaruah 2 is an Indian Assamese-language suspense thriller film released on 3rd February 2023 which is a sequel of Dr. Bezbarua, released 53 years ago. Dr. Bezbaruah 2 is directed by late Assamese actor Nipon Goswami who was also the lead actor of Dr. Bezbarua. The story, screenplay and dialogues are written by Rajdweep and music by Zubeen Garg. It is produced by Sanjive Narain and co-produced by Akshata Narain under the banner AM Television.

Cast 

 Adil Hussain as Dr. Bezbaruah
 Zubeen Garg as DSP Mahadev Borbaruah
 Siddharth Nipon Goswami as Advocate Shantanu Choudhary
 Kingkini Goswami as Sneha
 Nipon Goswami as Pradip Duarah (Cameo appearance)
 Madhurima Choudhury as Shantanu's mother
 Arun Hazarika as Shantanu's uncle.
 Gaurab Borah as Ranjan Goswami
 Jeanatte Bay as Shantanu's sister
 Papori Saikia
 Padmaraag Goswami as a famous journalist 
 Rajiv Kro
 Ashim Baishya
 Bhaskar Tamuly
 Rimpi Das in a special appearance in "Phool Phool" song
 Uddipta Goswami

Soundtrack 
The songs of the film is composed by Zubeen Garg and Diganta Bharati. Lyrics penned by Zubeen Garg, Diganta Bharati, Sasanka Samir, etc.

References

External links 
 

Assamese-language films
Films set in Assam
Upcoming films